Mary Walsh (October 1929 – 18 August 1976) was an Irish Fine Gael politician and publican. She stood unsuccessfully as a Fine Gael candidate at the 1973 general election for the Wicklow constituency. 

She was elected to Seanad Éireann on the Cultural and Educational Panel at the 1973 Seanad election. She died in 1976 during the 13th Seanad and Vincent McHugh was elected at the subsequent by-election.

References

1929 births
1976 deaths
Fine Gael senators
Members of the 13th Seanad
20th-century women members of Seanad Éireann
Politicians from County Wicklow